Paidra is a lake in Estonia.

See also
List of lakes in Estonia

Paidra
Võru Parish
Paidra